La Cantiga del Fuego (literally "the song of fire" in Spanish) is the third studio album by Ana Alcaide, released in November 12, 2012 and sung in both Spanish and Judeo-Spanish.

Track listing

Personnel
Taken from the album's booklet:

 Ana Alcaide - vocals, nyckelharpa, violin, soundscrapes, Celtic harp
 Reza Shayesteh - vocals
 Bill Cooley - psaltery, santur, ud, medieval lute, tar
 Jaime Muñoz - clarinet, diatonic accordion, Turkish ney, kaval, bagpipe, drums
 Rafa del Teso - acoustic guitar, mandola
 Josete Ordoñez - additional acoustic guitar, Spanish guitarrillo
 Renzo Ruggiero - acoustic bass, sound effects, electric bass, hurdy-gurdy
 Dimitri Psonis - Greek lyra, additional santur
 Ido Segal - hansa veena 
 Sergey Saprychev - percussion
 Diego López - additional percussion

References

2012 albums
World music albums
Judaeo-Spanish-language music
Spanish-language albums